The Croatian Rowing Federation is the governing body of rowing in Croatia. It organizes the Croatian representation at international competitions and the Croatian national championships.

The federation was formed on November 4, 1939 in Zagreb. It became a member of the Croatian Olympic Committee in 1991 and the International Federation of Rowing Associations in 1992.

It organized the World Rowing Championships on Jarun in 2000.

Past Olympic Medalists

References

Croatia
Rowing in Croatia
Rowing
Sports organizations established in 1939
1939 establishments in Croatia